Batley Grammar School is a state-funded co-educational free school in Batley, West Yorkshire, England, for pupils aged 4 to 16.

History
The school was founded in 1612 by the Rev. William Lee. An annual founder's day service is held in his memory at Batley Parish Church, as requested in his will, although it is not held on the date originally specified. In 1878, the school moved to its current site at Carlinghow Hill, Upper Batley. The school selected boys on their performance in the eleven-plus exams, regardless of family background. Following the introduction of comprehensive schools, the school became a private school in 1978 and entry became restricted to boys whose parents could afford its fees.

The school introduced girls into the sixth form in 1988 and became co-educational in 1996. In 2011, it became a state-funded free school. The following year, it celebrated its quatercentenary. A junior school, Priestley House (after Joseph Priestley, an old Batelian) is set in the grounds. The school has had several Royal visits; the Royal family lands on its playing fields when visiting the area. Prince Andrew has visited the school, as has Princess Anne.

On 25 March 2021, a teacher was suspended after a cartoon of Muhammad was shown in class during a discussion about press freedom and religious extremism, which sparked protests outside the school, demanding the resignation of the teacher involved, and a 61,000 signature petition of support. Gary Kibble, the head of Batley Grammar has offered an apology. Commenting on the situation, Communities Secretary, Robert Jenrick, said teachers should be able to "appropriately show images of the prophet" in class and the protests are "deeply unsettling" due to the UK being a "free society". He added teachers should "not be threatened" by religious extremists.
The trust conducted an investigation, concluding in May 2021, that in respect for the community, images of Muhammad should not be used, and lifted the teacher's suspension.

Notable Old Batelians
Former pupils of the school are referred to as Old Batelians.

Ismail Dawood, former English county cricketer
Richard Dawson, former English county cricketer
Andrew Firth, Michael Brooke and Ben Davies, members of indie-pop band The Dandys
Tim Fountain, Writer
Lee Goddard, former English County Cricketer
Cecil Grayson (1920–1998), Serena Professor of Italian, University of Oxford, 1958–1988
Sir Herbert Holdsworth, 1890–1949, Liberal and later Liberal National MP
Benjamin Ingham (1712–1772), Methodist and Moravian evangelist and preacher
Godfrey Lienhardt (1921–1993), anthropologist
Andrew Milner, Professor of English and Comparative Literature, Monash University
Sir Mark Oldroyd (1843–1927), woollen manufacturer, politician and philanthropist
David Peace, Author
Richard Pearson, former English county cricketer
Joseph Priestley (1733–1804), theologian, natural philosopher, and discoverer of oxygen
Richard Reed, co-founder of innocent Drinks
Sir Owen Willans Richardson (1879–1959), Professor of Physics, Princeton University, 1906–1914, Wheatstone Professor of Physics, King's College London, 1914–1924, and Yarrow Research Professor, Royal Society, 1924–1959, Nobel Prize in Physics (1928)
Sir Titus Salt (1803–1876), textile manufacturer and politician
David Stiff, professional cricketer
Samuel Sugden (1892–1950), Professor of Physical Chemistry, Birkbeck College, London, 1932–1937, and Professor of Chemistry, University College London, 1937–1950
Theodore Cooke Taylor (1850–1952), Businessman, Liberal politician, Profit-sharing pioneer
Lawrence Tomlinson, businessman and philanthropist
Paul Trepte, Organist of Ely Cathedral
Horace Waller VC (1896–1917), First World War Victoria Cross recipient
Lukas Wooller, keyboardist with the band Maxïmo Park
Thomas Wormald (1802–1873), surgeon

See also 
List of English and Welsh endowed schools (19th century)

References

External links

 Official website of Batley Grammar School

Free schools in Yorkshire
Educational institutions established in the 1610s
1612 establishments in England
 
Secondary schools in Kirklees
Primary schools in Kirklees
Batley